The Mayor of Bălți is head of the executive branch of Bălți City Council.

List of mayors 
Mayors of Bălți: 
{| class="toccolours" style="margin: 0 1em 0 1em;"
|-
! align="center" colspan="1" style="background:#ccccff;" | Name
! align="center" colspan="1" style="background:#ccccff;" | Period
|-
|    Dimitrie Dobriș   
| 1918 
|-
|   Dumitru Vrabie    
| 1918 - ? 
|-
|   Ștefan Pirogan (1)   
| 1922–1924 
|-
|   Ștefan Sadovici  
| 1924–1925
|-
|    Traian Bonciu 
| 1925–1926 
|-
|   Ștefan Pirogan (2) 
| 1927
|-
|   Iacob Cociorva (1) 
| 1927–1929 
|-
|   Ștefan Pirogan  (3)
| 1929
|-
|   Ștefan Pirogan  (4)
| 1931–1932 
|-
|   Mihai Cucer (1)
| 1932 
|- 
| Krupovetkin
| 1932
|-
|   Iacob Cociorva (2)
| 1933–1934 
|-
|   Petru Vrabie
| 1934–1937 
|-
| Mihai Cucer (2)
| 1937–1938
|- 
| Constantin Satmari
| 1938–1939
|- 
| Iacob Cociorva (3)
| 1939–1940
|- 
| Teodor Ardeleanu
| 1941–1943
|- 
| colonel M. Anghelescu
| 1943–1944
|- 
| Grigore Borodin
| 1945–1950
|- 
| Vasile Gherasimenco
| 1950–1953
|-
| Petru Poloz
| 1953–1958
|-
| Ivan Cuschevici
| 1961–1964
|-
| Petru Petrușin
| 1965–1973
|-
| Anatolii Guharac
| 1973–1976
|-
| Vasile Iovv
| 1976–1980
|-
| Gheorghe Gusac
| 1980–1985
|-
| Vladimir Molojen
| 1985–1987
|-
| Victor Morev (1)
| 1987–1990
|-
| Vladimir Tonciuc
| 1990–1995
|- 
| Victor Morev (2)
| 1995–1999
|- 
| Victor Morev (3)
| 1999–2001
|- 
| Vasile Panciuc (1)
| June 17, 2001–2003
|- 
| Vasile Panciuc (2)
| 2003–2007
|- 
| Vasile Panciuc (3)
| 2007–2011
|- 
| Octavian Mahu
| 2011
|- 
| Vasile Panciuc
| 2011 - 2 July 2015
|- 
| Renato Usatîi (1)
| 2 July 2015 - 2018
|- 
| Nikolay Grigorishin
| 2018 - 2019
|-
| Renato Usatîi (2)
| 2019 - 2021
|-
| Tatiana Dubitkaia
| 2021 - 2021
|-
| Nikolay Grigorishin (2)
| 2021 - Present

Mayors of places in Moldova
People from Bălți
Balti